"Better Days (And the Bottom Drops Out)" is the debut single of American music group Citizen King from their second studio album, Mobile Estates (1999), as the second track. It was first released to rock radio on January 26, 1999, and was given a commercial release later the same year. The song peaked at number 25 on the US Billboard Hot 100 and number 20 on Canada's RPM Top Singles chart in August 1999. Citizen King did not release another single that replicated the success of "Better Days", making them a one-hit wonder.

Meaning
Citizen King bassist Mount Sims explained that "Better Days" is about the condition of the band three years before the song became a hit, when he was working at a general store and yearned for a life where music was his only focus.

Track listings
US and German CD single, US cassette single
 "Better Days (And the Bottom Drops Out)" – 3:38
 "Basement Show" – 3:22

US maxi-CD single
 "Better Days (And the Bottom Drops Out)" (album version) – 3:38
 "Better Days (And the Bottom Drops Out)" (Idiot Savant Remix) – 6:52
 "Better Days (And the Bottom Drops Out)" (McMonkey and Fries Remix) – 2:12
 "Better Days (And the Bottom Drops Out)" (Mario Caldato Jr. Remix) – 3:20
 "Checkout Line" (Cibo Matto Remix) – 3:53

Australian CD single
 "Better Days" (LP version)
 "Better Days" (Mario Caldato Jr. Remix)
 "Check Out Line" (Cibo Matto Remix)
 "Better Days" (Idiot Savant Remix)
 "Better Days" (McMonkey & Fries Remix)

Charts

Weekly charts

Year-end charts

Release history

In popular culture
 The song was included in the soundtrack for 2000 film Gone in 60 Seconds.
 The song was used to close out both the series pilot and series finale of the FOX sitcom Malcolm in the Middle.

References

1999 debut singles
1999 songs
Citizen King songs
Song recordings produced by Eric Valentine
Warner Records singles